In the mid-2000s, Everex began selling several brands of green computers. These computers are targeted at users that only need access to web applications, versus Microsoft Windows-based applications (however, the company does sell Windows Vista-installed variants).

Hardware

gBook
The "gBook" is a webbook, a laptop with a 15.4" WXGA+ Widescreen Display (1440 x 900) and a 1.5 GHz VIA C7-M Processor. It comes loaded with gOS Linux.

gPC
Two major variants of the gPC exist: one based on gOS Linux; the other, an Impact brand of Windows Vista low-power machines. Both utilize a VIA C7 CPU. The gPC also ships with a softmodem that is not enabled for consumer use, but is provided "for developers." A sequel, gPC2, was available through Wal-Mart. A third, the gPC3, with a 2 GHz AMD Sempron processor, 1 GB RAM, and Ubuntu 8.04, available through Newegg.

gPC mini
The gPC mini, a small, light nettop computer, was announced in April 2008: it includes a DVD recorder, DVI video output, and MySpace-driven content on gOS Space. It is intended as a competitor to the Mac mini.

Cloudbook

The Cloudbook is an Ultra-Mobile PC, running a VIA C7 CPU with either gOS Linux or Windows Vista. There is also a Stepnote variant that uses a Pentium Dual-Core CPU, instead of a VIA C7.

Software
gOS Linux is used on the lower-end models of the gPC and Cloudbook. Its core application suite is built upon Google Apps, and does not have many other applications installed. The other models use Windows Vista Home Basic, and its installed base of applications.

Photos

References

External links
ComputerWorld article on Microsoft reserving future XP installs to gPC and related machines
Article on "gPC Mini" targeted for Myspace users

Computers and the environment
Everex